The 1987 Giro di Lombardia was the 81st edition of the Giro di Lombardia cycle race and was held on 17 October 1987. The race started in Como and finished in Milan. The race was won by Moreno Argentin of the Gewiss–Bianchi team.

General classification

References

1987
Giro di Lombardia
Giro di Lombardia
1987 Super Prestige Pernod International